Peter Knudsen (born 16 July 1970) is a retired Danish football midfielder.

References

1970 births
Living people
Danish men's footballers
Silkeborg IF players
Danish Superliga players
Association football midfielders
Danish football managers
Silkeborg IF managers